Jeff Davis (born January 29, 1959) is an American entrepreneur and former professional stock car racing driver. He primarily competed in the NASCAR West Series during the 1990s and early 2000s, but also ran in the NASCAR Winston Cup Series, open-wheel racing series like Indy Lights, and sports car racing as part of the Sports Car Club of America.

Racing career
Growing up after being born in Indianapolis, Davis began racing go karts before moving to California to buy the Van-K Wheels company, the premiere kart racing wheels manufacturer and one of only 3 companies in the United States to make wheels for kart racing. In 1985 and 1986, he competed in Formula Ford, followed by Formula Super Vee in 1988. At the end of 1989, he purchased a Formula Mazda car and prepared to run for the series' championship in 1990. He did that, while also winning Rookie of the Year. He won the Formula Mazda championship the following year.

In 1991, he contested the full Indy Lights schedule running on a tight budget that had him basically running an old worn out car with a proven team as a field filler entry since the series wanted more cars in the races. He finished tenth in points after taking the checkered flag in every race except for the season openers at Long Beach & Phoenix that he'd missed by starting after they'd already been run. Although all Indy Lights drivers drove spec Buicks, Davis had little financial support, receiving it from "people who were stretching their budgets just to be there." Davis could never get the Indy Lights car to handle since it had a really loose, worn-out tub and suspension tuning failed to make much difference.

During the 1991 racing season, he also participated in sports car racing. In February, he ran the 24 Hours of Daytona, driving a Spice Engineering Chevrolet for Tom Milner Racing in place of Paul Newman who had paid to run that race but couldn't show up in time for practice, something that was required by IMSA. The team retired with engine problems after 448 laps and finished 14th overall, sixth in the GTP class. Other sports car starts included racing in the Trans-Am Series, winning a race at Portland International Raceway.

Stock car racing
In 1992, Davis made his NASCAR Winston West Series debut at El Cajon Speedway, finishing ninth. Later in the year, he competed in the Pyroil 500K at Phoenix International Raceway in a NASCAR Winston Cup Series/Winston West companion race, driving a Ford from Roush Racing. He qualified 39th in the 42-car grid, with various Winston West cars being sent home after qualifying too slowly. Davis, who had no experience with races that featured multiple pit stops and restarts, finished 26th; he was the second-placed West Series driver in the race behind John Krebs (23rd).

The following season, in what he called his "first really disappointing year in auto racing", he attempted to run five Cup races, but the series' competitiveness made "a quantum leap from one year to the next" and he only qualified once (Sears Point Raceway, where he finished 42nd). During the year, he also ran two ARCA Hooters SuperCar Series races at Texas World Speedway and Atlanta Motor Speedway; he finished 23rd and 21st after suspension failure and a crash, respectively.

Davis ran the full 1994 Winston West schedule, recording nine top tens and a best finish of fourth at Tri-City Raceway as he finished fourth in the standings. In August, he and 13 other West drivers attempted to qualify for the Cup Series' inaugural Brickyard 400, a race that saw a NASCAR-record 86-driver entry list.

In 1997, Davis returned to the Cup Series at Sears Point, driving the No. 9 Ford for Melling Racing. Although he competed under Melling's banner, Davis owned the car and equipment used in the race; the team, plagued by sponsorship issues, had skipped the race to save money, and all points earned by Davis went to Melling in the owner's championship. He finished 37th after being involved in a wreck with John Andretti on lap 64. Two years later, he joined Zali Racing's No. 92 for the 1999 Las Vegas 400; after being the 50th-fastest driver in the first round of qualifying, he was replaced by Morgan Shepherd for the second round. A similar driver change occurred later in the year at the Brickyard 400, when Davis qualified the No. 62 of Fenley-Moore Motorsports in round one (54th) before Lance Hooper took over the car.

After the 1997 and 1998 Cup seasons, Davis entered the series' exhibition races in Japan at Suzuka Circuit and Twin Ring Motegi, respectively. In the former's NASCAR Thunder Special Suzuka, he was one of nine Winston West drivers to compete as he finished 26th. Motegi's Coca-Cola 500 featured ten entrants from the West Series including Davis, who also fielded a car for Japanese driver Hideo Fukuyama. Davis and Fukuyama finished 14th and 17th, respectively.

Davis competed in the West Series until 2005, with his final start being a 20th-place finish at Stockton 99 Raceway. In 56 career races, he has 17 top tens.

Personal life
Davis was born in and grew up in Indianapolis, Indiana and graduated from North Central High School, followed by earning his business management degree at Indiana University – Purdue University Indianapolis.

Near the end of his high school years, he started a landscaping company that he incorporated and named Lawnicure Inc., which he ran through his college years along with plowing snowy driveways and small parking lots in the winters. After selling Lawnicure in 1984, he saw an opportunity to buy Van-K Engineering in southern California while on a trip to help a friend race in a support race at the Long Beach Grand Prix. Van-K Engineering is a go-kart wheel manufacturing business that was started a few years earlier by Mike VanKralingen. Davis then moved with his wife across the country to start a new life on the west coast. His Van-K business sponsored him throughout his racing career, and he owned the company until he sold it to Circle Wheels in 2000 and he worked for them for a year to help them grow into the country's go-kart racing wheel market. Van-K Wheels is the leading manufacturer in the USA for the racing kart industry and sells thru Dealers & Distributors and to chassis building companies.

Motorsports career results

NASCAR
(key) (Bold – Pole position awarded by qualifying time. Italics – Pole position earned by points standings or practice time. * – Most laps led.)

Winston Cup Series

West Series

ARCA Hooters SuperCar Series
(key) (Bold – Pole position awarded by qualifying time. Italics – Pole position earned by points standings or practice time. * – Most laps led.)

American open–wheel racing
(key) (Races in bold indicate pole position)

Indy Lights

Sports car racing
(key)

24 Hours of Daytona

References

External links
 

1959 births
Living people
Racing drivers from California
Sportspeople from Orange, California
Indiana University–Purdue University Indianapolis alumni
24 Hours of Daytona drivers
ARCA Menards Series drivers
Indy Lights drivers
NASCAR drivers
Trans-Am Series drivers